Frank Longo is an American puzzle creator, and author of over 90 books, which have sold over 2 million copies.

Longo is known for creating unusual crosswords, such as one on a 50x50 grid, the Jumbo Puzzles compilation of 29x29 puzzles and is the creator and author of The New York Times Spelling Bee anagram puzzle.

Longo is noted as an influence by several puzzle creators, including Brendan Emmett Quigley and Joanne Sullivan.

References 

Year of birth missing (living people)
Living people
21st-century American male writers
20th-century American male writers
Crossword compilers
20th-century American writers
The New York Times people